Braemar is a northern village of the Southern Highlands of New South Wales, Australia in Wingecarribee Shire. It is located two km north-east of Mittagong and is often considered to include the hamlet villages of Balaclava and Willow Vale.

History

Braemar had a passenger train station on the Picton Loop railway line, which opened as Rushs Platform on 1 March 1867. In 1892 it was renamed Braemar to coincide with the renaming of the village. On 5 August 1978, the station was closed to passenger services. At present, the station only services a concrete sleeper supplier and the company Clyde Engineering.

Population
At the 2021 census, the population of Braemar had increased to 966.

References

Towns of the Southern Highlands (New South Wales)